Rafi Cohen (רפי כהן; born March 2, 1965) is an Israeli football manager and retired footballer, who currently serves as the assistant manager for the Israel national football team. He played in soccer for Hapoel Jerusalem, Beitar Jerusalem, Maccabi Petah Tikva, Hapoel Petah Tikva, and the Israel national football team. He has formerly managed Beitar Shimshon Tel Aviv, Hakoah Ramat Gan, Hapoel Ashkelon, Hapoel Petah Tikva, Hapoel Haifa, Beitar Shimshon Tel Aviv, Sektzia Ness Ziona, Hakoah Amidar Ramat Gan, Ironi Nir Ramat HaSharon, and Maccabi Yavne. He won a bronze medal with Team Israel at the 1981 Maccabiah Games.

Career
Born in Jerusalem, Cohen joined Beitar Jerusalem at the age of 11. As a senior, Cohen moved to Hapoel Jerusalem, where he played until he returned to Beitar, in 1982. In 1984 Cohen moved to Petah Tikva, where he played for Maccabi and Hapoel until his retirement in 1994. 

Cohen was part of the Israeli team in the 1981 Maccabiah Games, winning a bronze medal, and made two appearances with the senior squad in 1990.

Following retirement from active football, Cohen stayed at Hapoel Petah Tikva as youth coach and assistant coach until 2000. In 2001 Cohen was appointed as head manager for Beitar Shimshon Tel Aviv and led the team for 3rd place in Liga Artzit, just 3 points shy of promotion. The following season, Cohen was appointed as head manager of Hakoah Ramat Gan and led the club to promotion to second tier Liga Leumit. In 2004–05, Cohen once again won promotion from Liga Artzit, this time with Hapoel Ashkelon, while leading the club to the semi-finals of the State Cup and winning the 2004–05 Toto Cup Artzit.

Following his successes in third tier Liga Artzit, Cohen was appointed to coach Hapoel Petah Tikva in the Israeli Premier League, but was sacked after 8 matches. In 2009, Cohen once again won promotion from Liga Artzit with Sektzia Ness Ziona, and kept managing the team until 2012. At the beginning of the 2013–14 season, Cohen was appointed to coach Ironi Nir Ramat HaSharon, but was sacked early after a few matches.

Honours

As player
 Israel State Cup
 Winner: 1991–92
 Runner-up: 1990–91
 Liga Leumit (top division)
 Runner-up: 1989–90, 1990–91
 Toto Cup Leumit
 Winner: 1989–90, 1990–91
 Maccabiah Football Tournament
 Bronze medal: 1981

As manager
 Liga Artzit (third tier)
 2002–03 (with Hakoah Ramat Gan), 2004–05 (with Hapoel Ashkelon), 2008–09 (with Sektzia Ness Ziona)
 Toto Cup Artzit
 2004–05 (with Hapoel Ashkelon)

References

1965 births
Living people
Competitors at the 1981 Maccabiah Games
Israeli footballers
Footballers from Jerusalem
Beitar Jerusalem F.C. players
Hapoel Jerusalem F.C. players
Maccabi Petah Tikva F.C. players
Hapoel Petah Tikva F.C. players
Israeli football managers
Beitar Shimshon Tel Aviv F.C. managers
Hakoah Ramat Gan F.C. managers
Hapoel Ashkelon F.C. managers
Hapoel Petah Tikva F.C. managers
Sektzia Ness Ziona F.C. managers
Hakoah Amidar Ramat Gan F.C. managers
Hapoel Nir Ramat HaSharon F.C. managers
Maccabi Yavne F.C. managers
Israeli Premier League managers
Liga Leumit players
Maccabiah Games competitors
Maccabiah Games footballers
Maccabiah Games bronze medalists for Israel
Association football forwards